Janie Gets Married is a 1946 American comedy film directed by Vincent Sherman, and written by Agnes Christine Johnston. The film stars Joan Leslie, Robert Hutton, Edward Arnold, Ann Harding, Robert Benchley, and Dorothy Malone. The film was released by Warner Bros. on June 22, 1946.

This is a sequel to 1944's Janie. Hutton, Arnold, Harding, and Benchley reprise their earlier roles, but Leslie replaces actress Joyce Reynolds in the title role.

Plot
Dick Lawrence returns home from the Army and agrees to marry sweetheart Janie Conway, despite a month-to-month marital contract she has drawn up. Dick is also unaware that Janie is scheming to advance his career at her stepfather Charles Conway's newspaper.

Janie doesn't mind the arrival of soldier acquaintance "Spud" until it turns out Spud is an attractive former WAC. Things get further complicated when Spud is invited by Dick to spend a few days at their home, and when Janie's tomboy sister Elsbeth threatens to tell Dick what's really going on at the newspaper.

After attempting to make her husband jealous by demonstrating an interest in "Scooper," another military pal of his. Janie is caught kissing him, which nearly scuttles the sale of the paper until Elsbeth, of all people, saves the day for her sister.

Cast 
Joan Leslie as Janie Conway
Robert Hutton as Dick Lawrence
Edward Arnold as Charles Conway
Ann Harding as Lucille Conway
Robert Benchley as John Van Brunt
Dorothy Malone as Sgt. Spud Lee
Richard Erdman as Lt. 'Scooper' Nolan
Clare Foley as Elsbeth Conway
Donald Meek as Harley P. Stowers
Hattie McDaniel as April
Barbara Brown as Thelma Van Brunt
Margaret Hamilton as Mrs. Angles
Ann Gillis as Paula Rainey 
Ruth Tobey as Bernadine Dodd
William Frambes as 'Dead Pan' Hackett

References

External links 
 
 

1946 films
1946 comedy films
American black-and-white films
American comedy films
American sequel films
Films about weddings
Films directed by Vincent Sherman
Films scored by Friedrich Hollaender
Warner Bros. films
1940s English-language films
1940s American films